Bernard Maskit is an American mathematician known for his expertise in Kleinian groups. The Maskit slice through the moduli space of Kleinian groups is named after him; he is the author of the book Kleinian Groups (Grundlehren der Mathematischen Wissenschaften 287, Springer-Verlag, 1988) and gave an invited talk about Kleinian groups at the 1974 International Congress of Mathematicians.

Maskit earned his Ph.D. in 1964 from New York University under the supervision of Lipman Bers. After postdoctoral studies at the Institute for Advanced Study he was an assistant professorship at the Massachusetts Institute of Technology from 1965 to 1972. He then moved to the mathematics department at Stony Brook University, where he retired in 2008 and is now a professor emeritus. In 2012, he became one of the inaugural fellows of the American Mathematical Society.

References

Year of birth missing (living people)
Living people
Group theorists
20th-century American mathematicians
New York University alumni
Stony Brook University faculty
Fellows of the American Mathematical Society